Supraviețuitorul is the Romanian version of the international Survivor reality competition television series, itself derived from the Swedish television series Expedition Robinson created by Charlie Parsons which premiered in 1997. The series was announced on 23 December 2015, and aired on Pro TV from 12 September to 22 November 2016.

The show maroons a group of strangers in an isolated location, where they must provide food, water, fire, and shelter for themselves. The contestants compete in challenges for rewards and immunity from elimination. The contestants are progressively eliminated from the game as they are voted out by their fellow contestants, until only one remains and is given the title of "Sole Survivor" and is awarded the grand prize of €100,000.

Format and rules 

The show follows the same general format as the other editions of the show. The players are split between two "tribes", are taken to a remote isolated location and are forced to live off the land with meager supplies for an extended period of time. Frequent physical and mental challenges are used to pit the teams against each other for rewards, such as food or luxuries, or for "immunity", forcing the other tribe to attend "Tribal Council", where they must vote off one of their players.

Once about half the players are remaining, the tribes are merged into a single tribe, and competitions are on an individual basis; winning immunity prevents that player from being voted out. Most players that are voted out at this stage form the "Tribal Council Jury". Once down to two people, a final Tribal Council is held where the remaining players plead their case to the Jury as to why they should win the game. The jury then votes for which player should be considered the "Sole Survivor" and be awarded the grand prize.

Series overview

Series ratings 
Official ratings are taken from ARMA (Asociația Română pentru Măsurarea Audiențelor), the organisation that compiles audience measurement and television ratings in Romania.

See also 
Expedition Robinson
Survivor (UK TV series)
Survivor BG
Survivor Philippines
Australian Survivor
Survivor South Africa
Survivor Srbija
Sunt celebru, scoate-mă de aici!

References 

Pro TV original programming
Romania
Romanian reality television series